Kani Satiar (also Romanized as Kānī Sātīār) is a village in Palanganeh Rural District, in the Central District of Javanrud County, Kermanshah Province, Iran. At the 2006 census, its population was 59, in 13 families.

References 

Populated places in Javanrud County